Merriam was a town in Scott County, in the U.S. state of Minnesota. The town has since been closed altogether.

History
Merriam was platted in 1866. The community was named for John L. Merriam, a Minnesota legislator. A post office was established at Merriam in 1872, closed in 1873, reopened in 1879, and closed permanently in 1905.

References

Former populated places in Minnesota
Former populated places in Scott County, Minnesota